Johnnie Walker (January 7, 1894 – December 5, 1949), sometimes credited as Johnny Walker, was an American actor and producer popular from the silent era to the late 1930s. He appeared in a variety of short and feature films, including the highly successful features Captain Fly-by-Night, Over the Hill to the Poorhouse, Broken Hearts of Broadway and Old Ironsides. He began his film career in 1915.

Background
The eldest son of William (1865–1940) and Johanna Walker (1871–1942), he was born John William Walker in New York City on January 7, 1894. His father was a New York City plumber. Young Walker served as a pay clerk in the United States Naval Reserve Force (December 1918-May 1919).

Partial filmography

Destruction (1915)
Cohen's Luck (1915)
On Dangerous Paths (1915)
Greater Than Fame (1920)
Over the Hill to the Poorhouse (1920)
Fantômas (1920)
 Bachelor Apartments (1921)
 What Love Will Do (1921)
 Play Square (1921)
 The Jolt (1921)
 Live Wires (1921)
Extra! Extra! (1922)
Captain Fly-by-Night (1922)
The Third Alarm (1922)
The Fourth Musketeer (1923)
Mary of the Movies (1923)
Red Lights (1923)
Broken Hearts of Broadway (1923)
Children of Dust (1923)
 Fashionable Fakers (1923)
The Mailman (1923)
Wine of Youth (1924)
Life's Greatest Game (1924)
Galloping Hoofs (1924)
The Mad Dancer (1925)
Lena Rivers (1925)
The Scarlet West (1925)
Lilies of the Streets (1925)
The Reckless Sex (1925)
Children of the Whirlwind (1925)
The Earth Woman (1926)
Lightning Reporter (1926)
Morganson's Finish (1926)
Transcontinental Limited (1926)
Honesty – The Best Policy (1926)
Fangs of Justice (1926)
Old Ironsides (1926)
The Clown (1927)
The Snarl of Hate (1927)
Held by the Law (1927)
Good Time Charley (1927)
The Swell-Head (1927)
The Princess on Broadway (1927)
Wolves of the Air (1927)
Pretty Clothes (1927)
Rose of the Bowery (1927)
Bare Knees (1928)
So This Is Love? (1928)
The Matinee Idol (1928)
Vultures of the Sea (1928)
Melody Man (1930)
Ladies of Leisure (1930)
Ladies in Love (1930)
The Girl of the Golden West (1930)
Enemies of the Law (1931)
The Swellhead (1931)

References

External links

Johnnie Walker ; allmovie bio

1894 births
1949 deaths
Male actors from New York City